Martin Newell may refer to:

Martin Newell (computer scientist), British computer scientist, creator of the Utah teapot
Martin Newell (musician) (born 1953), British singer-songwriter, poet and author
Martin Newell (priest) (born 1967), English priest
Martin L. Newell (born 1939), Irish mathematician and Gaelic footballer
Martin J. Newell (1910–1985), Irish mathematician and educationalist, who served as President of University College Galway from 1960 to 1975